Myopodin protein, also called Synaptopodin-2 is a protein that in humans is encoded by the SYNPO2 gene. Myopodin is expressed in cardiac, smooth muscle and skeletal muscle, and localizes to Z-disc structures.

Structure 

Myopodin is a 117.4 kDa protein composed of 1093 amino acids, although four alternatively-spliced isoforms have been described. Myopodin contains one PPXY motif, multiple PXXP motifs, and two potential nuclear localization sequences (one N-terminal and one C-terminal). PPXY motifs have been shown to mediate interactions, and PXXP motifs represent potential sites of interaction for SH3 domain-containing proteins. Myopodin contains a novel actin binding site (between amino acids 410 and 563) in the center of the protein.

Function 

During myotube differentiation, myopodin interacts with stress fibers prior to co-localizing with alpha actinin-2 at Z-discs in mature striated muscle cells. Myopodin has been shown to shuttle between the nucleus and cytoplasm in myoblasts and myotubes in response to stress; its export from the nucleus is sensitive to lemtomycin B. The nuclear localization of myopodin is sensitive to Importin 13, which directly binds myopodin and facilitates its translocation. Importin binding and nuclear import of myopodin appears to be mediated by serine/threonine phosphorylation-dependent binding of myopodin to 14-3-3 beta Myopodin appears to regulate compartmentalized, intracellular signal transduction between the Z-disc and nucleus in cardiac muscle cells, by forming a Z-disc signaling complex with alpha actinin-2, calcineurin, CaMKII, muscle-specific A-kinase anchoring protein, and myomegalin. Specifically, phosphorylation by protein kinase A or CaMKII, and dephosphorylation by calcineurin facilitates the binding or release, respectively, of 14-3-3-beta, and the corresponding nuclear or cytoplasmic localization, respectively, of myopodin.

Interactions 

Myopodin interacts with:

 14-3-3 beta,
 Actin, alpha, cardiac muscle 1,
 Actinin, alpha 2,
 Calcineurin,
 CaMKII,
 Importin 13, and
 Protein kinase A.

References

Further reading